This is a list of Scientology officials and former officials who have served prominent roles in the Church of Scientology and its leadership.

Officials

Deceased officials

Former officials

See also 
 List of Scientologists

References

Further reading

External links 

Lists of clerics
Lists of office-holders
Lists of people by employer